This is a list of songs about bicycles or cycling.

Bicycles became popular in the 19th century as the new designs of safety bicycle were practical for the general population, including women.  By the end of that century, cycling was a fashion or fad which was reflected in the popular songs of the day. The most famous of these was "Daisy Bell", inspired by the phrase "a bicycle made for two".  The vogue for cycling songs continued into the Edwardian era and modern examples continue to appear in the 21st century.

List

References

Further reading

External links
 Bike Radar — songs about bicycles
 Guardian readers recommend — songs about bicycles
  — 2,100 Songs directly related to bicycling, most definitive list.

 
Bicycles
songs about bicycles